Marvel Legends is an action figure line based on the characters of Marvel Comics.

Marvel Legends may also refer to:

 Marvel: Ultimate Alliance, a video game formerly titled "Marvel Legends"
 Marvel Legends (comics)
 Marvel Studios: Legends, a streaming series from Marvel Studios